In a rematch of last year's semifinal, Elena Dementieva successfully defended her title, beating world No. 1 Serena Williams in the final 6–3, 6–2.

Seeds
The top two seeds receive a bye to the second round.

  Serena Williams (final)
  Dinara Safina (quarterfinals)
  Svetlana Kuznetsova (second round)
  Caroline Wozniacki (first round)
  Elena Dementieva (champion)
  Victoria Azarenka (semifinals)
  Jelena Janković (first round)
  Vera Zvonareva (first round, retired due to right ankle injury)

Draw

Finals

Top half

Bottom half

External links
Singles Main and Qaulifying Draw, Doubles Main Draw

W